The 1970–71 Sheffield Shield season was the 69th season of the Sheffield Shield, the domestic first-class cricket competition of Australia. South Australia won the championship.

Table

Statistics

Most Runs
Barry Richards 1101

Most Wickets
Ross Duncan 34

References

Sheffield Shield
Sheffield Shield
Sheffield Shield seasons